Gabriel Arana (born April 10, 1983) is an American journalist. He is currently Editor-in-Chief of the Texas Observer and previously was senior editor at Mic. He was previously a contributing writer at Salon and a senior editor at The Huffington Post" and "The American Prospect. His articles have appeared in numerous publications, including The New York Times, The Atlantic, The New Republic, The Nation, The Advocate, and The Daily Beast. He is also known for writing a 2012 profile of the ex-gay movement in which psychiatrist Robert Spitzer repudiated his work supporting sexual orientation change efforts. After the article was published, Spitzer released a letter apologizing to the gay community, citing his interaction with Arana. In 2010, Arana was nominated for a GLAAD Media Award for Outstanding Magazine Article for a feature story on the legal challenge to California's Proposition 8. In 2014, he was awarded the National Lesbian and Gay Journalists Association's Excellence in Feature Writing Award for his profile of activist Dan Choi. He has been a guest on television and radio talk shows including The Dr. Oz Show, Rachel Maddow, Starting Point, and Talk of the Nation.

Personal background 
Gabriel Arana grew up in Nogales, Arizona, on the Mexico–United States border. He attended Yale University where he wrote for the Yale Daily News and graduated with a degree in linguistics. He then attended Cornell University, from which he holds a master's degree, also in linguistics. He married his same-sex partner in Washington, D.C. in 2011.

References

1983 births
Living people
American male journalists
American LGBT writers
Cornell University alumni
Yale College alumni
American LGBT journalists
LGBT people from Arizona